Zebrahead, more commonly known as Yellow or The Yellow Album, is the debut studio album by the American punk rock band Zebrahead. The songs "Check" and "Hate" are both re-recorded from their One More Hit demo tape released two years prior in 1996.  Most of the songs on the album would end up re-recorded later and released as part of the band's follow-up and first mainstream album, Waste of Mind.  The song "Check" would therefore end up re-recorded twice so far.

Singles
"Check" is the only known single from the album and was accompanied by a music video. It was also featured in the soundtrack of the skateboarding video game Tony Hawk's Pro Skater 3.

Track listing

Personnel
Ali Tabatabaee – lead vocals
Justin Mauriello – lead vocals, rhythm guitar
Greg Bergdorf – lead guitar
Ben Osmundson – bass guitar
Ed Udhus – drums

References

1998 debut albums
Zebrahead albums
Doctor Dream Records albums
Albums produced by Howard Benson
Demo albums